Buka is a town located on the southern coast of Buka Island, in the Autonomous Region of Bougainville, in eastern Papua New Guinea. It is administered under Buka Rural LLG.

It is the capital of the North Bougainville District, and the interim capital of the Autonomous Region of Bougainville.

It contains Our Lady of the Assumption Cathedral.

Geography

The city and Buka Island are separated from the northern tip of Bougainville Island by the deep, the narrow Buka Passage, which varies in width from 980 to 3,000 feet (300 to 1,070 metres) wide. Both islands are in the northern Solomon Islands archipelago, and the only major ones not within the nation of Solomon Islands. 

Buka island is volcanic formation measuring 35 miles by 9 miles (56km by 14km), with a total land area of 190 square miles (492 square km). The elevation reaches to 1,634 feet (498 metres) in the hills in the southwest and the interior of the island is densely forested. Rainfall is abundant, with more than 100 inches (2,500 mm) annually. Coral reefs fringe the south and west coasts, the latter deeply indented by Queen Carola Harbour. 

Buka consists of three major geological units: a plateau of uplifted coral reefs, steep hills and coral formations of post-Pleistocene age.

The city is served by Buka Airport.

History
Discovered by Europeans in 1768, the German Empire laid claim to the island in 1899, annexing it into German New Guinea. Buka became the capital of the Bougainville Province decades later, during the 1990s Bougainville Civil War. The former, or "proper" capital of Bougainville, Arawa, was all but destroyed in 1990 as tensions reached a critical level in a civil uprising, which ended in 1997. The Bougainville government intends to return the capital to Arawa in the future.

See also

Buka Rural LLG

References

 01
Populated places in the Autonomous Region of Bougainville
Populated coastal places in Papua New Guinea
Provincial capitals in Papua New Guinea